William Reade may refer to:
William Reade (bishop), medieval bishop of Chichester
William Winwood Reade, British historian
William Reade (MP) for Northumberland (UK Parliament constituency)

See also
William Rede (disambiguation)
William Read (disambiguation)
William Reid (disambiguation)
William Reed (disambiguation)